Papyrus 105 (in the Gregory-Aland numbering), designated by 𝔓105, is a copy of the New Testament in Greek. It is a papyrus manuscript of the Gospel of Matthew. The surviving texts of Matthew are verses 27:62-64; 28:2-5, they are in a fragmentary condition. The manuscript has been paleographically estimated to date back to the 5th or 6th century CE.

Text
The Greek text of the codex is a representative of the Alexandrian text-type.

Location
The manuscript is currently housed at the Sackler Library (Papyrology Rooms, P. Oxy. 4406) at Oxford.

See also
 List of New Testament papyri
 Matthew 27, Matthew 28
 Oxyrhynchus Papyri

References

Further reading

 J. David Thomas, The Oxyrhynchus Papyri LXIV (London: 1997), pp. 12–13.

External links

Images 
 P.Oxy.LXIV 4406 from Papyrology at Oxford's "POxy: Oxyrhynchus Online" 
 𝔓105 recto 
 𝔓105 verso

Official registration 
 "Continuation of the Manuscript List" Institute for New Testament Textual Research, University of Münster. Retrieved April 9, 2008 

New Testament papyri
5th-century biblical manuscripts
Gospel of Matthew papyri